The 2016–17 Oberliga Hamburg was the 72nd season of the Oberliga Hamburg, the top football league in the German state of Hamburg, since its establishment in 1945. The season began on 29 July 2016 and concluded on 26 May 2017.

TuS Dassendorf won their 4th consecutive and 5th overall Oberliga Hamburg title. Klub Kosova, TuS Osdorf, and Wedeler TSV were promoted to the Oberliga Hamburg at the end of the 2015-16 season. Kosova was promoted from the Landesliga Hamburg-Hansa, while Osdorf and Wedeler were promoted from the Landesliga Hamburg-Hammonia.

Teams

Stadiums and locations
Note: Table lists in alphabetical order.

Managers

Managerial changes

Results

League table

Results table

References

Oberliga Hamburg
2016–17 Oberliga